Lê Lâm Quỳnh Như ( or ; born 9 September 1970), known professionally as Như Quỳnh ( or ), is a Vietnamese-American singer. Performing Vietnamese popular music in the diaspora, she is internationally known for her vocal style, as well as duets with musicians like Thế Sơn and Trường Vũ, with whom they have been noted to "link international Vietnamese music to Vietnam itself".

Biography and career

1970–1994: Early life 
Lê Lâm Quỳnh Như was born in Đông Hà, Quảng Trị Province, South Vietnam, on 9 September 1970, to father Lê Văn Chánh, as the oldest child with two younger brothers, one named Tường Khuê. Her mother, an employee of the Bank of Commerce before the Fall of Saigon, was going to name her Đông Hà, after her birthplace but decided to name her Lâm Quỳnh Như instead. She was born sickly, and nearly died. For most of her childhood, her family lived through economic troubles after the Fall of Saigon. At a very young age, she performed in Ho Chi Minh City, first regularly on the stage of her old elementary school, and later in local children's television programs. Như Quỳnh studied music under professor Ba Thai of the Vietnamese National Music Institute and for a time, she taught music to young children in District 1, Ho Chi Minh City. In 2018, she stated that her mother was also interested in music, but her grandparents forbid her from attending art school, as they wanted children to focus on general education. During this time, she would occasionally watch American music videos and learn of American culture, which was a rare opportunity at the time.

Như Quỳnh's singing career formally began in 1991, where she performed in the Television Singing Contest in Ho Chi Minh City and won the special prize for her performance of "Mùa xuân trên thành phố Hồ Chí Minh". In April 1993, Như Quỳnh's family immigrated to the United States and settled in Philadelphia, Pennsylvania. Như Quỳnh received welfare and went to school, later starting work to support the family. In 1994, her parents met a fellow countryman with connections to Asia Entertainment, Inc.

1994–1996: Chuyện hoa sim and Asia Entertainment 
Her first musical performances were appearances in the Asia Entertainment variety shows Asia 6 and Asia 7, where she performed "Ngừơi tình mùa đông" and "Chuyện hoa sim", respectively. The former created an image of a singer with a sweet, clear and blissful voice and attracted listeners internationally, while the latter showed her capability of singing many genres and styles of music.

Under Asia Entertainment, she released three solo studio albums. Her first album, Chuyện hoa sim, was released on May 1, 1995, and was considered a best seller in the Vietnamese music industry (released outside of Vietnam). Her second album, Rừng lá thay chưa was released on August 5, 1995, including the songs "Rừng lá thay chưa" and "Như vạt nắng" performed at Asia. Her third studio album Chuyện tình hoa trắng, released on January 1, 1996, also fared well, containing the song of the same name. Như Quỳnh has also made guest appearances in other albums released under the label.

1996–2007: Lawsuit and transfer to Thúy Nga 
On June 30, 1996, Như Quỳnh's contract with Asia Entertainment reached a deadline, and a letter was sent the following month expressing her desire not to renew the contract, stating that she had performed and contributed to the required shows and albums. However, the company prevented her from performing outside of the contract through October 1996. Như Quỳnh sued the company for unpaid royalties and mental damage, claiming that two different contracts were signed. Asia also filed a lawsuit against Như Quỳnh, with the argument that she did not record the satisfactory number of records, and performed at shows outside of the contract. Asia Entertainment Inc. v. Quynh Nhu Le was later dismissed, with the explanation that Asia Entertainment did not meet the criteria to accuse the singer.

Như Quỳnh signed a contract with music label, Thúy Nga, where she debuted in the 38th event of the show Paris by Night with "Hoa tím ngày xưa". She continued to perform on the show as a mainstay for many years, with songs like "Vào hạ", "Nỗi buồn Châu Pha", "Đêm chôn dầu vượt biển", "Chuyện tình buồn", "Nửa vầng trăng", "Chung mộng", and "Em đi xem hội trăng rằm", establishing her icon for Vietnamese women as well as earning the title of the "Queen of Folk".

In 1996, Như Quỳnh formed her own record label, N-Q Records, to allow her to release records in various genres and styles, in contrast to albums released under the main Thúy Nga label aimed to suit a broader audience. By 1999, she had merged the label with a newer record label, Như Quỳnh Entertainment.

2007–present: Temporary move to Asia and return 
In 2007, Như Quỳnh made her farewell appearance with Thúy Nga with "Mưa trên quê hương" in Paris by Night 89. In August, Như Quỳnh returned to Asia Entertainment, making appearances in the shows Asia 56 and Asia 57. Later in 2008, she released the album Về lại đồi sim with her younger brother Tường Khuê (who had previously appeared in Hẹn một mùa xuân) and her adoptive brother Tường Nguyên, with whom she has made several collaborative albums on her own record labels. Her final performance with the label was in Asia 63, as well as an album release in 2009 titled Mưa buồn.

After two years with Asia, Như Quỳnh left and rejoined Thúy Nga, performing in Paris by Night 98 in Las Vegas. On September 1, 2010, Như Quỳnh released her tenth album under Thúy Nga titled Duyên phận. Như Quỳnh then released the album Lạ giường in spring 2011 in a joint collaboration with Thúy Nga and Như Quỳnh Entertainment.

Musical style 
Như Quỳnh has been described as a "traditional female vocalist". Along with her vocal performances when performing live, she also wears the traditional áo dài, which accentuates her image of a Vietnamese woman's "virginal innocence" in conjunction with her natural charm. Her performances have been described as having a sweet voice, with lyrics revolving around the homeland of Vietnam and impressive singing and dancing skills. Her vocal range at her debut was soprano; it has since deepened to mezzo-soprano by the release of the song "Duyên phận".

Như Quỳnh has stated that her voice fits well with the genres of rhumba, as well as music about the homeland and mothers. She is fond of the voices of singers Hương Lan, Khánh Hà, Ý Lan, Khánh Ly, Hoàng Oanh, Vũ Khanh, Duy Quang, Elvis Phương, and Thái Châu.

Personal life 
Shortly after her departure from Thúy Nga in mid-2006, Như Quỳnh gave birth to a baby girl in 2007 named Melody Đông Nghi; prior to the news, she had not disclosed any personal information. After some pictures of her husband and daughter were released, she informed the public about her marital status and that her husband, Nguyễn Thắng, was an aviation engineer working for the U.S. Federal Aviation Administration.

Around the time of her pregnancy, Như Quỳnh also faced many negative rumors about her, such as the possibility of an illegitimate child. Later in her career, she was featured in Vietnamese news, with much focus given to her appearance showing signs of aging. She is currently living in the United States with her family.

Discography

Studio albums

Live albums
These albums were released as part of the Thúy Nga Music Box series.

Compilation albums

Singles

Videography

Video albums

Filmography

Direct-to-videos

Television

References

External links
 

Living people
1970 births
Dong Ha
People from Quảng Trị province
21st-century Vietnamese women singers
20th-century Vietnamese women singers
Vietnamese emigrants to the United States